The Battle of Ankokuji (安国寺の戦い) was a battle during the Sengoku period (16th century) of Japan.

The battle of Ankokuji was a rather minor battle that took place after the fall of Fukuyo, in which Tozawa Yorichika, an ally of Takato Yoritsugu had surrendered to the Takeda forces. Following this, Itagaki Nobukata, a retainer under Takeda Shingen, would personally finish off Yoritsugu at Ankokuji. Yoritsugu's younger brother, Yorimune, however would be killed during this battle.

References

The Samurai Sourcebook

1542 in Japan
Ankokuji
Conflicts in 1542